William Martin (1933 – 30 May 2007) was a professional rugby league footballer who played in the 1960s.

International honours
Bill Martin won a cap for Great Britain while at Workington in 1962 against France.

References

External links
!Great Britain Statistics at englandrl.co.uk (statistics currently missing due to not having appeared for both Great Britain, and England)

Great Britain national rugby league team players
2007 deaths
Place of birth missing
Rugby league props
Workington Town players
1933 births